Dingiri Banda Welagedera (31 October 1915 - 2 April 1989) also known as D. B. Welagedera was the Deputy Minister of Plan Implementation and Minister a former Member of Parliament representing Kurunegala District. Welagedera served as the 1st Governor of North Central Province. He was appointed in May 1988 and was Governor until May 1989. He was succeeded by E. L. Senanayake.

Born on 31 October 1915 at Panaliya, Polgahawela, as Welagedara Mudiyanselage Dingiri Banda Welagedera was the only child of the family. He was educated at Ananda College, Colombo, Nalanda College, Colombo and at St. John's College, Jaffna before entering Colombo Law College. He joined government service in the first batch of Divisional Revenue Officers that replaced the native headmen system. He was elected the president of the Divisional Revenue Officers' Association. 

He resigned from government service to contest the 1952 general election from the United National Party from the Kurunegala District. He was elected to the House of Representatives defeating Herbert Sri Nissanka. He contested the July 1960 general election but lost to D. B. Monnekulama, but was successful in the 1965 general election and again defeated Monnekulama in the 1977 general election. He served as Parliamentary Secretary to the Minister of Nationalised Services from 1965 to 1970 and was appointed Deputy Minister of Plan Implementation in 1977. He served as Governor of the North Central Province from May 1988 to May 1989.

He died on 2 April 1989 and his body was donated to the Colombo Medical College. The Welagedara Stadium and the Welagedara Ayurveda Hospital has been named after him.

See also 
List of political families in Sri Lanka

References

 By B.D. Sumedha Aruna Shantha 

1915 births
1989 deaths
Alumni of Nalanda College, Colombo
Alumni of St. John's College, Jaffna
Deputy ministers of Sri Lanka
Governors of North Central Province, Sri Lanka
Members of the 2nd Parliament of Ceylon
Members of the 6th Parliament of Ceylon
Members of the 8th Parliament of Sri Lanka
Parliamentary secretaries of Ceylon
People from Kurunegala
Sinhalese politicians
Sri Lankan Buddhists
United National Party politicians